Mawson Peak is an active volcanic summit of the Big Ben massif on Heard Island, an external Australian territory in the Indian Ocean. 

The peak erupted as recently as April 2013 and February 2016.

Discovery and naming
Mawson Peak was named by the 1948 Australian National Antarctic Research Expeditions Heard Island Expedition after the Australian geologist and explorer Sir Douglas Mawson, the leader of the British Australian and New Zealand Antarctic Research Expedition 1929–31, who visited the island in NovemberDecember 1929.

On 20 February 1950, whilst aboard HMAS Lebuan, Thomas Gratton Young OAM observed and recorded in the ship's log that Mawson Peak was an active volcano.

The 1964–65 expedition to Heard Island was led by Major Warwick Deacock, with the schooner Patanela skippered by Major Bill Tilman. They succeeded in climbing Mawson Peak for the first time, which is the highest point on this remote island. An earlier attempt on the peak during the 1953-54 research expedition was described by its leader, John Béchervaise.

See also
 List of volcanoes in Antarctica
 List of volcanoes in Australia

References

Citations

Sources

External links
 Map of Heard Island and McDonald Islands, including all major topographical features
 Antarctic Names
 Volcano 
 Data

Mountains of Australia
Volcanoes of Heard Island and McDonald Islands
Highest points of countries